The bigeye squaretail, Tetragonurus atlanticus, is a fish native to the Atlantic, Indian and Pacific Oceans. They feed on soft-bodied medusae and salps and will also eat plankton.  Their average length is 50 cm, and their habitat is pelagic. They are toxic to humans.

References

Tetragonuridae
Fish described in 1839